I-ME-WE (India-Middle East-Western Europe) is a  submarine communications cable system between India and France. The design capacity is 3.84 Terabits per second. It has been operational since 2009 with Tripoli, Lebanon being connected in November 2011. Internet Service Providers and Network Operators hope to utilize the additional bandwidth to support high-bandwidth peer-to-peer IP-based broadband services such as multimedia streaming, broadband Internet and voice/video telephony.

The cable system includes a terrestrial link connecting the cities of Alexandria and Suez in Egypt.  The I-ME-WE cable system comprises three optical fiber cable pairs and 2 trunk lines. It has cable landing stations at:
 Mumbai (India) (two landing sites)
 Karachi (Pakistan)
 Fujairah (UAE)
 Jeddah (Saudi Arabia)
 Suez (Egypt)
 Alexandria (Egypt)
 Tripoli (Lebanon) Note: not Tripoli, Libya
 Catania (Italy)
 Marseille (France)

The cable system was funded by a consortium of 9 companies from across the world:
 Bharti Airtel (India)
 PTCL (Pakistan)
 Etisalat (UAE)
 France Telecom (France)
 Ogero (Lebanon)
 STC (Saudi Arabia)
 Telecom Egypt (Egypt)
 Telecom Italia Sparkle (Italy)
 Tata Communications (formerly VSNL) (India)

The contract for the construction and maintenance of the cable system has been awarded to Alcatel-Lucent.
Also, this network system extension is contracted to Mitsubishi Electric.

See also

Other cable systems following a substantially similar route are:

 Europe-India Gateway (EIG)
 FLAG Europe Asia
 SEA-ME-WE 3
 SEA-ME-WE 4
 SEA-ME-WE 5

References

External links
 Official website

Submarine communications cables in the Arabian Sea
Submarine communications cables in the Indian Ocean
Submarine communications cables in the Mediterranean Sea
Submarine communications cables in the Red Sea
Bharti Airtel
2009 establishments in Africa
2009 establishments in Asia
2009 establishments in Europe
2009 establishments in Maharashtra